Liam Dunne (born 1 September 1971) is an Irish former soccer player.

Senior career 

As a midfielder, he played for Bohemians  in 1990 and broke into the first team, making his league debut against Derry City on 2 September of that year. It was not long before he was snapped up by St Johnstone, after he impressed at the 1991 FIFA World Youth Championship for Ireland. This proved to be a shrewd move by Manager Alex Totten as Dunne certainly impressed while he was there. But in the 1992/93 season Alex Totten was sacked and new manager John McClelland didn't see young Dunne in his plans for the future. So next season Bohemians manager Eamonn Gregg brought him back to Dalymount Park.

Crusaders 

But Dunne did not settle back in Phibsborough and was soon sent on Loan to Crusaders FC of Northern Ireland for his first spell at the club. Dunne impressed at Seaview playing well and scoring regularly under manager Roy Walker. He then made his move permanent to Crusaders. He helped "Crues" to 2 consecutive IPA Premiership Titles in 1994 & 1995. He often turned out for the IFA XI which is for the best players in the IFA Premiership. Crusaders won the league in 1993/94 and in 1994-95.
Dunne the tried a move to Portadown FC but did not work out because of an argument with the manager. Dunne then went to Dundalk where, in 2002 he won the FAI Ford Cup. It was a short successful spell for Dunne at Dundalk as he was linking up with players like James Keddy. But in 2005 Crusaders manager Stephen Baxter whom Dunne had played with for Crusaders came calling for him to come back to Seaview. It was an offer Dunne could not refuse. But by now "Crues" were in the second tier of Irish Football and were chasing promotion and they achieved it by winning the IFA Championship in the 2005-06 season. They had also won the Steel & Sons Cup that year. Crusaders went on to finish 6th in the IFA Premiership next season with experienced players such as Dunne and Jeff Spiers combining with younger players such as Colin Coates and David Rainey for a good season.
But for Dunne this was to be his last game as he retired after the 2006-07 season.

Honours 
While at Seaview Dunne won 2 Irish Leagues, 1 Irish League Cup, The Gold Cup  and FAI Cup for Dundalk, the Steel & Sons Cup, The IFA Intermediate League and the George Wilson Cup. Dunne also won 4 caps for the Republic of Ireland U21 Team.

After Football 
Now Dunne lives in his hometown Dublin and works as a plumber. He has three children Jack, Sam and Kate. Both Sam and Jack are promising Footballers Jack playing for Home Farm FC and Sam playing for St Pauls Artane

References 

1971 births
Living people
Republic of Ireland association footballers
League of Ireland players
Scottish Football League players
NIFL Premiership players
Bohemian F.C. players
St Johnstone F.C. players
Crusaders F.C. players
Dundalk F.C. players
Portadown F.C. players
Glenavon F.C. players
Republic of Ireland under-21 international footballers
Stella Maris F.C. players
Belvedere F.C. players
Association football midfielders